Ian David is an Australian writer, best known for his work in television, particularly adaptations of true stories such as Police Crop: The Winchester Conspiracy, Joh's Jury and Blue Murder.

Select Credits
A Country Practice
Police Crop: The Winchester Conspiracy (1990) – TV movie
Joh's Jury (1992) – TV movie
Blue Murder (1995) – mini series
Bad Cop, Bad Cop (2002) – TV series
The Shark Net (2003) – TV mini series
3 Acts of Murder (2009) – TV movie
Killing Time (2011) – TV mini series

References

External links

Australian television writers
Living people
Year of birth missing (living people)
Australian male television writers